The Amsterdam Dungeon, in the city of Amsterdam, Netherlands, follows a similar format to the London Dungeon, York Dungeon, Berlin Dungeon and Hamburg Dungeon which are owned and operated by UK-based Merlin Entertainments and attempts to show history through an interactive adventure. Live actors, a ride, shows and special effects simulate historical dark and bleak times, it was first opened in September 2005.

Attractions

 Torture Chamber: The Torture Chamber is the most graphically implied exhibit in the entire Dungeon. The (female) torturers line up the 'prisoners' against a wall and pick out a young male visitor for the demonstration. The visitor is strapped in to a chair surrounded by torture devices, such as the dreaded appendage cutter, the torturer places the appendage cutter near the male's groin and 'demonstrates' the device 'inch by inch'.
 VOC: An 18th century dockside bar teaches about press ganging of locals to join the nautical trading firm the Dutch East India Company (VOC).  They are then ambushed and forced on board a replica ship where they are forced to work for the captain Piet Heyn and fight the Spanish.
 Ship's Doctor: Looks at ship's doctor's surgery where the surgeon gives witness of the brutalities of 18th century field surgery at sea.
 Council of Blood: A short film about the terror brought the Netherlands by the Spanish Inquisition in the 16th century. An Inquisition court is then held similar to the Judgement of Sinners show in the UK, but the ‘Inquisitor’ is more menacing with his humour.
 Ghosts: Using atmospheric special effects to animate the ghost story of a woman convicted as a witch in the 16th century and brutally tortured before being burned at Dam Square.
 Labyrinth of Lost Amsterdam: A disorientating and eerie mirror maze themed around the winding, disorientating streets of Amsterdam.
 The Great Plague: A recreation of the streets of plague ravaged Amsterdam street, where the devastating effect the killer disease had in the city in 1664 is vividly animated.
 Reaper: Drop Ride to Doom, is a MACK Rides e-Motion roller coaster that winds around a real 13th century church. Themed upon the Grim Reaper legend, it provides a finale to the Dungeon experience. The ride has been closed since 1/5/2014 and will not reopen.

Parent company

The Amsterdam Dungeon also has sister sites in the London Dungeon, York Dungeon, Edinburgh Dungeon, Berlin Dungeon and Hamburg Dungeon. Each Dungeon is based on the same theme but investigates the history of its own local area. The Dungeons are owned by Poole-based Merlin Entertainments.

External links
 The Amsterdam Dungeon

Buildings and structures in Amsterdam
Tourist attractions in Amsterdam
Merlin Entertainments Group